Ram Shakal is an Indian politician. He is a nominated  member of the Rajya Sabha the upper house of the Parliament of India. He was elected to the Lok Sabha the lower house of Indian Parliament from Robertsganj in Uttar Pradesh in 1996, 1998 and 1999 as a member of the Bharatiya Janata Party.

References

External links
Official biographical sketch in Parliament of India website 

India MPs 1996–1997
India MPs 1998–1999
India MPs 1999–2004
Lok Sabha members from Uttar Pradesh
1963 births
Living people
People from Sonbhadra district
Nominated members of the Rajya Sabha
Bharatiya Janata Party politicians from Uttar Pradesh